List of Members of the 9th Lok Sabha (2 December 1989 – 13 March 1991) elections in 22–26 November 1989. The Lok Sabha (House of the People) is the lower house in the Parliament of India. Twelve sitting members from Rajya Sabha were elected to 9th Lok Sabha after the 1989 Indian general election.

Vishwanath Pratap Singh became the Prime Minister from 2 December 1989 to 10 November 1990 with the help of the Bharatiya Janata Party and the Left Parties. INC loses 207 seats as compared to previous 8th Lok Sabha after the 1984 Indian general election

Later Chandra Shekhar became Prime Minister from 10 November 1990 to 21 June 1991 with outside support from Indian National Congress under Rajiv Gandhi.

The next 10th Lok Sabha was formed on 20 June 1991 after the 1991 Indian general election.

Important members 
 Speaker:
Rabi Ray from 19 December 1989 to 9 July 1991
 Deputy Speaker:
Shivraj Patil from 19 March 1990 to 13 March 1991
Secretary General:
Subhash C Kashyap from 31 December 1983 to 20 August 1990
K C Rastogi from 10 September 1990 to 31 December 1991

List of members by political party

Members of the political party in 9th Lok Sabha are given below:

External links
 Lok Sabha website

References

 
 Terms of the Lok Sabha
India MPs 1989–1991
1989 establishments in India
1991 disestablishments in India